Gimhae Stadium is a multi-purpose stadium in Gimhae, South Korea.  It is currently used mostly for football matches.  The stadium has a capacity of 25,000 people and was opened in 2005.

External links
 Gimhae Sports Facilities Management Center  

Football venues in South Korea
Multi-purpose stadiums in South Korea
Sports venues in South Gyeongsang Province